Salem Township is one of the seventeen townships of Highland County, Ohio, United States. As of the 2010 census the population was 780, up from 682 at the 2000 census.

Geography
Located in the western part of the county, it borders the following townships:
Dodson Township - north
Hamer Township - east
Clay Township - south
Green Township, Brown County - west
Perry Township, Brown County - southwest

No municipalities are located in Salem Township, although the unincorporated community of Pricetown lies in the township's east.

Name and history
It is one of fourteen Salem Townships statewide.

Government
The township is governed by a three-member board of trustees, who are elected in November of odd-numbered years to a four-year term beginning on the following January 1. Two are elected in the year after the presidential election and one is elected in the year before it. There is also an elected township fiscal officer, who serves a four-year term beginning on April 1 of the year after the election, which is held in November of the year before the presidential election. Vacancies in the fiscal officership or on the board of trustees are filled by the remaining trustees.

References

External links
County website

Townships in Highland County, Ohio
Townships in Ohio